XEZF-AM is a radio station on 850 AM in Mexicali, Baja California, Mexico. It is owned by Grupo Audiorama and is known as Buenisiima with a grupera format.

History

XEZF received its first concession on November 27, 1963. It was owned by Miguel Vildosola Castro and sold by his successors to Silvia Lacarra Hinojosa in 1996. Hinojosa sold to Audiorama in 1998.

References

External links
Audiorama Radio Stations
XEZF Radio Locator Information

Radio stations in Mexicali
Radio stations established in 1963
Daytime-only radio stations in Mexico